{{Infobox rugby league biography
| name               = Jean Dauger
| image              = Jean_Dauger.png
| image_size         = 120px
| alt                = 
| caption            = Portrait of Jean Dauger in 1938
| fullname           = 
| birth_date         = 
| birth_place        = Cambo-les-Bains, France
| death_date         = 
| death_place        = Cambo-les-Bains, France
| height             =  
| weight             =  
| retired            = yes
| first              = RU
| ru_position        = Centre
| ru_club1           = Aviron Bayonnais
| ru_year1start      = 1936
| ru_year1end        = 38
| ru_appearances1    = 
| ru_tries1          = 
| ru_goals1          = 
| ru_fieldgoals1     = 
| ru_points1         = 
| ru_club2           = Aviron Bayonnais
| ru_year2start      = 1941
| ru_year2end        = 56
| ru_appearances2    = 
| ru_tries2          = 
| ru_goals2          = 
| ru_fieldgoals2     = 
| ru_points2         = 
| ru_teamA           = France
| ru_yearAstart      = 1945
| ru_yearAend        = 1953
| ru_appearancesA    = 3
| ru_triesA          = 2
| ru_goalsA          = 0
| ru_fieldgoalsA     = 0
| ru_pointsA         = 6
| position           = 
| club1              = Roanne
| year1start         = 1938
| year1end           = 41
| appearances1       = 
| tries1             = 
| goals1             = 
| fieldgoals1        = 
| points1            = 
| teamA              = France<ref>Le Rugby à XIII le plus français du monde written by Louis Bonnery mentions 5 caps, lEncyclopédie de Treize Magazine d'André Passamar mentions 6 caps.</ref>
| yearAstart         = 1938
| yearAend           = 39
| appearancesA       = 5
| triesA             = ?
| goalsA             = 
| fieldgoalsA        = 
| pointsA            = 
| source             = 
}}

Jean Dauger (Cambo-les-Bains, 12 November 1919 – 12 October 1999) was a French rugby union and rugby league footballer. He played as a centre. He was nicknamed Manech, which is a Lower Navarre Basque translation of his given name.

 Career 
Dauger first started his career at 17 years, as first-choice for Bayonne in 1936 while he was working locally at the cadastre.

In 1938, he shifts to the semi-professionalism of rugby league, playing for RC Roanne XIII alongside Robert Samatan and Max Rousié while working for the Devernois factory, not appreciating the pseudo-amateur mores of the championship at the time. 
He was considered by the rugby league literature as "an attack prince" , "an exceptional back with dazzling start-up and an ultra-developed sense of game".

In 1941, he returned to Bayonne as the Vichy regime and its Révolution nationale had banned rugby league.

His two union international caps in 1945 for France on 1 January 1945 against Army Rugby Union (greeted by Jacques Chaban-Delmas, who will play alongside him in the following test cap against the British Empire XV on 28 April 1945), caused a very grave crisis against other national teams, being the reason of a 8-year eclipse. His last cap was on 10 January 1953, also brought a new crisis against Scotland.

He still would play for Bayonne until 1956; he is the great centre who inspired his successors such as Maurice Prat, Roger Martine and André Boniface. He was also the spiritual son of former Agen and Roanne player Robert Samatan.

Later, Dauger became a journalist for Paris-Presse and wrote a book dedicated to rugby: Histoires... de rugby (published by Calmann-Levy in 1965, redacted in 1967) with a preface written by Jean Prat, as well Le Rugby en dix leçons.

In 1973, he was the coach France national rugby union team alongside Jean Desclaux.

From 3 June 2001, in his memory, Aviron Bayonnais' home stadium, Parc des Sports Saint-Léon was renamed Stade Jean Dauger.

His daughter Michou married Jean Grenet, mayor of Bayonne and president of Aviron; their son François Grenet was a professional footballer with clubs including Girondins de Bordeaux.

Rugby union career 
 Aviron Bayonnais
 Champion of France (1943)
 Vice-Champion of France (1944)

Other 
 Coupe de France finalist for the Côte Basque-Béarn representative team (on 10 April 1944).

International 
 International (3 caps) - (1945 and 1953 Five Nations Championship)

Rugby league career 
 RC Roanne XIII
 Champion of Lord Derby Cup with Roanne (1938)
 Champion of France with Roanne (1939)

References

External links 
 Jean Dauger international rugby union statistics

1919 births
1999 deaths
Aviron Bayonnais players
Dual-code rugby internationals
France international rugby union players
France national rugby league team players
French rugby league players
French rugby union coaches
French rugby union players
RC Roanne XIII players
Rugby league centres
Rugby union centres
Sportspeople from Pyrénées-Atlantiques